Angelika Film Center is a movie theater chain in the United States that features independent and foreign films. It operates theaters in New York City, Texas, Washington, D.C., California and Virginia. Its headquarters are in New York City.

History and locations

Flagship location (The Cable Building, NoHo, New York City)
The original Angelika Film Center & Café opened in New York City's NoHo neighborhood in 1989. The New York Angelika, which is located at The Cable Building on the corner of Houston and Mercer Streets, is the flagship cinema.

Other locations
Additionally, Angelika Film Center has opened 6 additional locations, one of which has closed:
In 1997, it opened a theater in Houston, Texas, which was closed August 29, 2010. 
In 2001, an Angelika opened in the Mockingbird Station in Dallas, Texas 
In 2004, an Angelika opened in Plano, Texas.
In the fall of 2012, an Angelika opened an 8-screen theater in the Mosaic District of Fairfax County, Virginia.
In the summer of 2014, Angelika started operating a "Pop-Up" theater in Union Market in Washington, D.C., with plans for an expansion that ultimately fell through in the summer of 2016.
On October 9, 2015, a new location opened in San Diego’s North County.
Village East by Angelika in New York City, built 1926, opened under the Angelika brand 2021

Angelika 57, an art cinema in midtown Manhattan on 57th Street between Broadway and Seventh Avenue, operated between 1993 and 1997.

Additional history

From 1997 to 2005, the Angelika Film Center was used as the set for At The Angelika, a weekly TV series distributed by IFC Films. The show moved to the IFC Center on Sixth Avenue and changed its name to At the IFC Center when that venue opened in June 2005.

The Angelika launched a blog where they post their own video and written interviews with directors and actors that are involved with the films they show.

The Angelika Film Center is owned by Reading International and iDNA, Inc.

In Snowball Effect: The Story of Clerks (on the Clerks X DVD) Kevin Smith and Vincent Pereira recall attending movies at the Angelika (notably Richard Linklater's debut Slacker). The film also mentions the disastrous first public screening of Clerks at the Independent Film Feature Market (the IFFM) and has a scene with Smith and Scott Mosier standing outside the theatre.

In November 2015, Shia LaBeouf invited the public to join him in the Cable Building location as he watched the 29 movies that feature him back-to-back. While taking short coffee breaks, LaBeouf could be viewed almost continuously on a live-stream.

On March 5, 2021, they rebranded the Cinema 123 in midtown Manhattan and Village East Cinemas in Greenwich Village under Branded by Angelika. Both theaters previously operated as City Cinemas before their purchase in 2000 by Citadel Cinemas, an affiliate of Reading Entertainment, which were in turn consolidated on December 31, 2001 to form Reading International, the parent company of Reading Cinemas, which owns and operates the Angelika Film Center.

See also

 List of art cinemas in New York City

References

External links
Angelika Film Center website
Angelika Film Center on CLG Wiki

Movie theatre chains in the United States
Entertainment companies established in 1989
Cinemas and movie theaters in Manhattan
Cinemas and movie theaters in Texas
Companies based in New York City
Greenwich Village
Companies affiliated with the Reading Company